Andrognathidae is a family of millipede in the order Platydesmida. There are about 17 genera and more than 30 described species in Andrognathidae.

Genera
These 17 genera belong to the family Andrognathidae:

 Andrognathus Cope, 1869
 Bazillozonium Verhoeff, 1935
 Brachycybe Wood, 1864
 Dolistenus Fanzago, 1874
 Ebenostenus Mauriès, 2015
 Fioria Silvestri, 1898
 Gosodesmus Chamberlin, 1922
 Ischnocybe Cook & Loomis, 1928
 Mitocybe Cook & Loomis, 1928
 Phaeacobius Attems
 Plutodesmus Silvestri, 1903
 Pseudodesmus Pocock, 1887
 Sinocybe Loomis, 1942
 Symphyopleurium Attems, 1951
 Trichozonium
 Yamasinaium Verhoeff, 1939
 Zinaceps

References

Further reading

 
 
 
 
 

Platydesmida
Millipedes of North America
Articles created by Qbugbot
Millipede families